Shaw may refer to:

Places

Australia
Shaw, Queensland

Canada
Shaw Street, a street in Toronto

England
Shaw, Berkshire, a village
Shaw, Greater Manchester, a location in the parish of Shaw and Crompton
Shaw, Swindon, a suburb of Swindon
Shaw, Wiltshire, a village near Melksham

Philippines
Shaw Boulevard, a major thoroughfare in Metro Manila
Shaw Boulevard station, a station of the MRT-3

United States
Shaw, Kansas, an unincorporated community
Shaw, Mississippi, a city
Mount Shaw, a summit in the Ossipee Mountains of New Hampshire
Shaw Creek (Ohio), a stream in Ohio
Shaw, Tennessee, now known as Burwood, Tennessee
Shaw, West Virginia, a ghost town
Shaw, Washington, D.C., a neighborhood
Shaw, St. Louis, Missouri, a neighborhood
Shaw Air Force Base, US Air Force base in South Carolina

People
Shaw (name), people with "Shaw" as given name or surname
Shao, Chinese surname, also spelled "Shaw"
Clan Shaw of Tordarroch, a Scottish clan

Education
Shaw Academy, an Irish online training and higher education institution
Shaw High School (disambiguation)
Shaw Junior High School, listed on the National Register of Historic Places in Washington, D.C.
Shaw College (disambiguation)
Shaw College (Hong Kong), a college of the Chinese University of Hong Kong
Shaw College of Detroit, a former college
Shaw University (est. 1865), an American historically black college in Raleigh, North Carolina

Entertainment
 Shaw Family, a fictional crime/spy family from Fast&Furious, see List of The Fast and the Furious characters

Shaw Brothers Studio (1958–2011), formerly the largest film production company in Hong Kong
Shaw Organisation (est. 1924), a Singapore film distributor and chain of movie theatres
Shaw Festival (est. 1962), a Canadian theatre festival

Organizations
D. E. Shaw & Co. (est. 1988), an American hedge fund, private equity and technology development firm
Shaw Communications (est. 1966), Canadian telecommunications company, based in Calgary
ShawCor (est. 1930s), a global energy services firm based in Houston, Texas
The Shaw Group (est. 1987), a diversified American Fortune 500 corporation (now acquired by CB&I)
Shaw Industries (est. 1946), an American flooring manufacturer
Shaw Media (United States), an American newspaper publisher
Shaw's and Star Market, an American grocery group

Other uses
Shaw (woodland), a strip of woodland, usually separating fields or lining a road
Shaw alphabet, another name for the Shavian alphabet, an alternative for the Latin alphabet for the English language

See also

Shaw Landing, Wisconsin, an unincorporated community
Shaw Park, a baseball stadium in Winnipeg, Canada
Shaw Tower (disambiguation)
Justice Shaw (disambiguation)
Shawe (disambiguation)